Francis Joseph Reilly (17 September 1916 – 15 November 2003) was an Australian rules footballer who played with Richmond in the Victorian Football League (VFL).

Reilly was a rugged back pocket in Richmond's loss to Essendon in the 1942 VFL Grand Final.

He worked in the police force and in 1946 transferred to Ballarat, where he joined the East Ballarat Football Club, as coach.

Joe Reilly married Rosie May Martin in Melbourne in 1945, shortly before their move to Ballarat.

References

1916 births
2003 deaths
Australian rules footballers from Victoria (Australia)
Richmond Football Club players
East Ballarat Football Club players
Australian military personnel of World War II